is a Japanese ski jumper. In his long World Cup career, Yoshioka has finished twelve times among the top 10. He also has four podium finishes as well as two team victories on 30 January 1999 in Willingen, and on 19 January 2001 in Park City.

At the 2001 FIS Nordic World Ski Championships he finished 19th on the normal hill and 20th on the large hill. He placed 19th at the 1998 FIS Ski Flying World Championships.

External links

1978 births
Living people
Japanese male ski jumpers
Asian Games medalists in ski jumping
Ski jumpers at the 2011 Asian Winter Games
Asian Games gold medalists for Japan
Asian Games silver medalists for Japan
Medalists at the 2011 Asian Winter Games